Robin "Rob" Watson (born 23 June 1983) is a Canadian long distance runner. He is a two-time Canadian national champion in the 3000 metres steeplechase. He has won the Canadian Marathon Championships, the Canadian 10k Championships (twice) and placed 2nd in the Canadian Cross Country Championships.

Career 

The fourth of five boys. Robin Watson grew up in the Old South neighbourhood in London, Ontario. His parents were recreational runners; his mother ran track, his father marathons. His oldest brother Pete has been his greatest influence. Wanting to run like him, Watson entered a 10k race with him at age six. His endurance, and help from his brother, made him a top steeplechaser by the end of high school. He accepted a scholarship at West Virginia University where his brother Pete attended running in the National Collegiate Athletic Association (NCAA). After a year that saw WVU cutting its track program, Watson followed his brother to Colorado and began running track and cross- country for coach Bryan Berryhill at Colorado State University.

He got a call from coach Dave Scott-Thomas, and on graduating moved to Guelph, Ontario, to train for the 2009 International Association of Athletics Federations (IAAF) world championships in Berlin. After a disappointing finish, Watson and his coach discussed him running the marathon. After struggling for success, Watson turned to his brother Pete who was coaching in North Carolina.

He entered the 2012 marathon in Rotterdam but ran a 2:13:37 race and failed to qualify for financial support from Athletics Canada. In summer 2012, Watson moved to Vancouver, British Columbia. Watson subsequently finished first in the 2013 Canadian Marathon Championships and second in the 2014 Canadian Marathon Championships.

Watson has coached at Mile2 Marathons for more than  four years.

Profile 

Legend:

 Not Legal

References

 
 

1983 births
Living people
Athletes (track and field) at the 2015 Pan American Games
Canadian male long-distance runners
Canadian male steeplechase runners
Athletes from London, Ontario
Pan American Games track and field athletes for Canada